Florida's Constitution of 1885, its fifth, was drawn up by the Constitutional Convention of 1885. The convention was held from June 9, 1885 until August 3, 1885
in Tallahassee, Florida "for the purpose of reforming the "Carpetbag" Constitution of 1868", according to course literature from the University of Virginia. It was Florida's fifth constitutional convention and restored the election of many public officials, reduced the salaries of the governor and other state officers, made the governor ineligible for reelection, abolished the office of lieutenant governor, and provided for a legislature of fixed numbers.

The agreed-upon constitution added a residency requirement, forbade a second consecutive term for the office of governor, made the cabinet elected instead of appointed, and made many state and local offices elective. It also gave the legislature the option of requiring the payment of a poll tax as a requirement for voting (Article VI, Section 8). This was a compromise between smaller "black belt" counties who wanted more offices elected and those from larger and more prosperous counties. The poll tax disenfranchised African-Americans, and anyone else too poor to pay the tax. Racial segregation in schools was mandatory (Article XII, Section 12). The constitution also prohibited marriage between "a white person and a person of negro descent" (Article XVI, Section 24).

The constitution ratified at the convention passed with a vote of 31,804 to 21,243. It was "the model" of Florida's government until 1968 and "represented the regression to racial discrimination which was occurring throughout the South in the post-Reconstruction era period."

The Constitution was weighted in favor of counties. Each new county was entitled to one to three representatives according to population. Every ten years the lower house was automatically reconstructed on a basis of these members for each of the five largest counties, two members for each of the next eighteen, and one for each remaining county. In 1930, the big counties of the time, containing Florida’s largest cities, Jacksonville, Tampa, and Miami, had a combined population of 451,977, and had nine representatives and three senators. The four smallest counties had a combined of population of only 30,000, but had four representatives and three senators. This overrepresentation of rural, conservative areas led to increasing tension in twentieth-century Florida politics, as central and then south Florida grew. It was a major factor leading to the current Constitution of 1968, which changed apportionment.

Delegates 
Delegates included seven African Americans.

 Henry C. Baker - Nassau
 Thomas N. Bell - Hamilton
 William A. Blount - Escambia
 Daniel Campbell - Walton
 Wallace B. Carr - Leon, an African American
 Lewis D. Carson - Liberty
 Syd L. Carter - Levy
 Henry W. Chandler - Marion, an African American
 Thomas E. Clark - Jackson
 Thomas L. Clarke - Jefferson
 Simon Barclay Conover, M.D. - Leon 
 James Wood Davidson - Dade
 Henry H. Duncan - Sumter
 George P. Fowler - Putnam
 F. B. Genovar - St. Johns
 Thomas Van Renssalaer Gibbs - Duval, an African American
 James D. Goss - Marion
 Jonathan C. Greeley - Duval
 William F. Green - 4th district
 Robert Henderson - Taylor
 John R. Herndon - 28th district
 Henry Clay Hicks - Franklin
 William A. Hocker - Sumter
 Samuel E. Hope - Hillsborough
 Joseph H. Humphries - Polk
 John B. Johnson - Alachua
 John Newton Krimminger - Santa Rosa
 John T. Lesley - Hillsborough
 Austin S. Mann - 22nd district
 Augustus Maxwell - Escambia
 Daniel M. McAlpin, First Assistant Secretary
 Alex. L. McCaskill - Walton
 James F. McClellan - Jackson
 A. Douglas McKinnon - Washington
 Hugh E. Miller - Marion
 William Hall Milton - Jackson
 John W. Mitchell - Leon, an African American
 John Neel - Holmes
 B.F. Oliveros - St. Johns
 William T. Orman - 5th district
 Henry L. Parker - Brevard
 John Parsons - Hernando
 Samuel Pasco, President - 9th district
 John C. Pelot, M.D. - Manatee
 Samuel Petty - Nassau, an African American
 Theodore Randell - Madison
 William H. Reynolds, Secretary
 John C. Richard - Bradford
 Robert Furman Rogers - Suwannee
 Norman T. Scott - Gadsden
 James Gamble Speer - Orange
 James B. Stone - Calhoun
 Thomas F. Swearingen - 7th district (Wakulla-Liberty)
 William F. Thompson - Leon, an African American
 Joseph M. Tolbert - Columbia
 John William Tompkins - Columbia
 Samuel J. Turnbull - Jefferson
 Burton Daniel Wadsworth - Madison
 David Shelby Walker, Jr. - 8th district
 William T. Weeks - Bradford
 John Westcott - St. Johns
 Charles Cooper Wilson - Polk
 James E. Yonge, 1st Vice President - Escambia

See also
 Florida Constitution
 Florida Constitutional Convention of 1838

References

External links
 Florida Constitution of 1885

Additional sources
Charles W. Tebeau, A History of Florida (Coral Gables: University of Miami Press, 1971), 288-290.
Michael Gannon, The New History of Florida (Gainesville: University Press of Florida, 1996), 263-264, 272, 275, 304.
"The Florida Convention," New York Times, June 18, 1885, 1.
"Florida's Constitution," New York Times, August 18, 1885, 11.
Full Text of 1885 Constitution
Journal of the proceedings of the Constitutional Convention of the state of Florida: which convened at the Capitol, at Tallahassee, on Tuesday, June 9, 1885

1885 in Florida
American constitutional conventions
Florida law
Government of Florida
Legal history of Florida
Anti-black racism in the United States
Defunct state constitutions of the United States
History of racism in Florida